SSLNT Women's College offers intermediate and bachelor's degree courses in the fields of arts, science, and commerce; and post-graduate degree courses in home science and B.Ed. TheiIntermediate courses are run under Jharkhand Academic Council, Jharkhand. The degree courses and post-graduate course in home science and B.Ed. are run under Binod Bihari Mahto Koyalanchal University, Dhanbad.

History 

The foundation of the main college building was laid by His Excellency the Governor & Chancellor of Bihar on 27 August 1962 Sri. Anant S.Iyengar. The main building of the college was inaugurated by the Hon. Late Smt. Indira Gandhi on 11 July 1965, the then Information & Broadcasting Minister of India. The college was affiliated with Bihar University in 1960. In 1961 the college became a part of the Ranchi University. In 1975 the college became a constituent unit of the Ranchi University. In 1992 the college was included in the newly founded Vinoba Bhave University. This college is now affiliated with Binod Bihari Mahto Koyalanchal University.

Courses

Intermediate 
 Arts
 Science
 Commerce

Degree courses in arts (Hons. & Gen.) 
 Hindi, Bengali, English, Sanskrit, Urdu
 Music, Economics, History, Pol. Sc., Philosophy, Psychology
 Mathematics
 Home Science

Degree courses in science (Hons. & Gen.) 
 Chemistry
 Physics
 Mathematics
 Zoology
 Botany

Degree courses in commerce (Hons. & Gen.) 
 Accountancy (Hons.)

Post-graduate courses in arts 
 Home Science, History, Political Science,

Self-financing courses 
 B.Ed.

Certificate courses 
BBA in Tourism Management.

Online computer training courses by IIT Bombay

Clubs 
 Research and Development Cell
 Self Development Center
 Art Forum
 Literary Circle
 Group Discussion Cell
 Nature Club
 Photography Club
 Science Club
 Alumni Association
 NSS
 NCC

Infrastructure 
 2 administrative buildings
 3 hostels
 Staff quarters
 Laboratories
 Canteen
 Library

Accreditation 
SSLNT Women's College was awarded a 'B' grade by the National Assessment and Accreditation Council (NAAC).

External links 
 Official site
 SSLNT at Facebook

Colleges affiliated to Binod Bihari Mahto Koyalanchal University
Women's universities and colleges in Jharkhand
Universities and colleges in Jharkhand
Education in Dhanbad
Educational institutions established in 1955
1955 establishments in Bihar